Hussain Mohammed Al Baharna (born on 5 December 1932) is a Bahraini lawyer, legal scholar, author and former minister. He holds PhD in Public international law from University of Cambridge and was a legal adviser and Minister of State for Legal Affairs for Government of Bahrain for 26 years. During his tenure he participated in writing the draft of Bahrain's first constitution in 1973. He also held several international positions and has authored a number of books.

Education

Al Baharna received Bachelor of Laws from the Law College at University of Baghdad in 1953. He then moved to London where he studied at Lincoln's Inn and became a Barrister-at-Law. In 1956, he received the Postgraduate Diploma in Law from University of London. After that he left for The Hague, the Netherlands where he received Diploma of Hague Academy of International Law. Finally in 1961, he received PhD in Public International Law from University of Cambridge.

Career

In the 1960s, Al Baharna was appointed as a legal adviser in Kuwait's Ministry of Foreign Affairs (1962–64) and after that as Legal Adviser and Analyst for Aramco (1965–68). In 1969, he was appointed Legal Adviser for Bahrain's Department of Foreign Affairs, and a year later he was made President of Legal Committee in Bahrain's Council of State. After Bahrain gained its independence from the United Kingdom in 1971, Al Baharna became the Minister of State for Legal Affairs in the first post-independence cabinet, a position which he held until mid-June 1995, when he was ordered to retire along with several other ministers.

During his period of tenure at government offices which lasted for about 26 years (1969–1995), Al Baharna participated in drafting the modern civil legislation of Bahrain. Most notably he was a member of the ministerial committee tasked with drafting the Constitution of 1973, which was the first such document in History of Bahrain. He was also Bahrain's Agent and Counsel before the International Court of Justice in the territorial dispute case between Bahrain and Qatar.

In 1987, Al Baharna was elected as representative of Asia to United Nations' International Law Commission. He was re-elected for four subsequent sessions in a row, serving continuously until 2006. In 1994, he was elected a board member of the International Council for Commercial Arbitration. Between 2003 and 2005, he served as member of the International Court of Arbitration (of International Chamber of Commerce). He is also a member in numerous local, regional and international legal institutions and societies.

Publications

Al Baharna has authored a number of articles and books in Arabic and English, in which he discussed, legal and historical topics about Bahrain and the world. Among his publications are the following books:
The Legal Status of the Arabian Gulf States: A Study of Their Treaty Relations and Their International Problems (1968)
The Gulf Cooperation Council: Its Legal and International Status (in Arabic, 1973)The Legal Status of Iraq's Claim to Sovereignty over Kuwait (in Arabic, 1991)
British Extra Territorial Jurisdiction in the Gulf 1913–1971 (1998)
Bahrain Between Two Constitutions (in Arabic, 2005)
Political and Constitutional Developments of the Gulf States (in Arabic, 2005)
The Bahrain Nationality Law and the State's Open-door Policy Regarding Naturalization of Foreigners (in Arabic, 2007)
A Legal Study and Analysis of the Constitutional State of the Kingdom of Bahrain (in Arabic, 2008) 
Iran's Claim To Sovereignty Over Bahrain And The Resolution Of The Anglo-Iranian Dispute Over Bahrain (in Arabic and English, 2008)

See also 

Politics of Bahrain

References

1932 births
Living people
Alumni of the University of Cambridge
Bahraini expatriates in the United Kingdom
Bahraini expatriates in the Netherlands